Weintraub is a Jewish German surname meaning "wine grape". It is cognate with the name Vayntrub and may refer to:

 Milana Vayntrub, American actress
 Jacqueline Vayntrub, American biblical scholar
 Abraham Weintraub, World Bank Group, Executive Director and former Minister of Education of Brazil (2018–2020)
 Annette Weintraub, American artist and writer
 Amir Weintraub, Israeli tennis player
 Ben Weintraub, pseudonym of Robert L. Brock
 Carl Weintraub, American actor
 David Weintraub (official), an official of the U.S. government
 E. Roy Weintraub, American economist
 Fred Weintraub, American producer
 Harold M. Weintraub, American biological scientist
 Jerry Weintraub, film producer
 Joseph Weintraub, Chief Justice of the New Jersey Supreme Court (1957–73)
 Karl Weintraub, professor of history at the University of Chicago
 Leon Weintraub, survivor of the Holocaust and physician
 Phil Weintraub (1907–1987), American major league baseball first baseman & outfielder
 Russell J. Weintraub, American lawyer
 Scott Weintraub, cast member of Big Brother 4 (U.S.)
 Sidney Weintraub (economist born 1914)
 Sidney Weintraub (economist born 1922)
 Stanley Weintraub, American professor, historian, and biographer
 Sy Weintraub, movie and television producer and an owner of Panavision

See also
 Weinrib (surname)

References

German-language surnames
Jewish surnames